The Royal Order of Victoria and Albert is a British Royal Family Order instituted on 10 February 1862 by Queen Victoria, and enlarged on 10 October 1864, 15 November 1865, and 15 March 1880. No award has been made since the death of Queen Victoria.

The order had four classes and was only granted to female members of the British royal family and female courtiers. For the first three classes, the badge consisted of a medallion of Queen Victoria and Prince Albert, differing in the width and jewelling of the border as the classes descend, whilst the fourth substitutes a jewelled cipher. All four were surmounted by a crown, which was attached to a bow of white silk moiré ribbon.  The honour conferred no rank or title upon the recipient, but recipients were entitled to use the post-nominal letters "VA".

The last holder of the Order, Princess Alice, Countess of Athlone, died in 1981.

Recipients

 1863 The Princess of Wales
 Elizabeth Biddulph, Baroness Biddulph (Woman of the Bedchamber)
The Countess of Mount Edgcumbe (Lady of the Bedchamber)
Jane Spencer, Baroness Churchill (Lady of the Bedchamber)
1889: The Marchioness of Dufferin and Ava
 Edith Bulwer-Lytton, Countess of Lytton

a full list of recipients is published on pages 37-41 of  Royal Service Volume 2

Sources
Whitaker's Almanack, 1893
British Imperial Calendar, 1900, 1902
The Times

See also
 Royal Family Order of George IV
 Royal Family Order of Edward VII
 Royal Family Order of George V
 Royal Family Order of George VI
 Royal Family Order of Elizabeth II
 List of awards honoring women

References

British honours system

Orders, decorations, and medals for women
Awards established in 1862
1862 establishments in the United Kingdom
British royal family
Royal family orders